Lacipa is a genus of moths in the subfamily Lymantriinae. The genus was erected by Francis Walker in 1855.

Species
Lacipa argyroleuca Hampson, 1910 southern Nigeria
Lacipa bizonoides Butler, 1894 Tanzania
Lacipa compta Collenette, 1952 north-east Zimbabwe
Lacipa croceigramma Hampson, 1910 northern Nigeria
Lacipa elgonensis Collenette, 1952 Uganda
Lacipa exetastes Collenette, 1952 Malawi
Lacipa florida (Swinhoe, 1903) eastern Africa
Lacipa flavitincta Hampson, 1910 eastern Africa
Lacipa floridula (Hering, 1926) Tanzania
Lacipa gemmatula Hering, 1926 Angola
Lacipa gracilis Hopffer, 1862 eastern Africa
Lacipa heterosticta Hampson, 1910 Uganda
Lacipa impuncta Butler, 1898 eastern Africa
Lacipa jefferyi (Collenette, 1931) Kenya
Lacipa megalocera Collenette, 1952 Congo
Lacipa melanosticta Hampson, 1910 Kenya
Lacipa neavei Collenette, 1952 Malawi
Lacipa nobilis (Herrich-Schäffer, [1855]) southern Africa
Lacipa ostra (Swinhoe, 1903) eastern Africa
Lacipa picta (Boisduval, 1847) Zimbabwe, southern Africa
Lacipa pseudolacipa (Hering, 1926) Tanzania
Lacipa pulverea Distant, 1898 southern Africa
Lacipa quadripunctata Dewitz, 1881 southern Africa
Lacipa rivularis (Gaede, 1916)
Lacipa robusta Hering, 1926 Cameroon
Lacipa sarcistis Hampson, 1905 southern Africa
Lacipa sarcistoides Hering, 1926 Tanzania
Lacipa subpunctata Bethune-Baker, 1911 Angola
Lacipa sundara (Swinhoe, 1903) Uganda, eastern Africa
Lacipa tau Collenette, 1931 Tanzania
Lacipa xuthoma Collenette, 1936 Kenya

References

Lymantriinae